Orlando Maturana Vargas (born 11 October 1965) is a Colombian former footballer.

International career
Maturana made several appearances for the senior Colombia national football team, including four matches at the 1993 Copa América. He officially represented the Colombia national football team in 6 occasions. He also made several appearances for the Colombia national team in unofficial games, most notably in 1993 against Bayern Munich and Palmeiras. Orlando Maturana was a prolific and creative goal scorer who earn a reputation as a poacher. His success in the national team was hampered by the availability of several more successful strikers such as Iván Valenciano, Antony de Ávila, John Jairo Trellez, Víctor Aristizábal, Luis Zuleta, Faustino Asprilla, Adolfo Valencia, and several other members of what is known today as the Colombian dream generation.

References

External links

1975 births
Living people
Colombian footballers
Colombia under-20 international footballers
Colombia international footballers
1993 Copa América players
Categoría Primera A players
Atlético Bucaramanga footballers
América de Cali footballers
Millonarios F.C. players
Club Atlético Independiente footballers
Deportes Tolima footballers
Club Olimpia footballers
Independiente Santa Fe footballers
Colombian expatriate footballers
Expatriate footballers in Paraguay
Expatriate footballers in Argentina
Association football forwards
Footballers from Barranquilla